Camille Tourville (December 4, 1927 – December 24, 1985) was a Canadian professional wrestler and manager, better known by his ring name, Tarzan Tyler. He was one-half of the first WWWF World Tag Team Champions, along with Luke Graham.

Professional wrestling career
Tarzan Tyler began competing in the United States during the 1960s after having spent nearly 10 years wrestling in Canada. Tyler competed for World Championships against such stars as Verne Gagne, Lou Thesz, and Dory Funk Jr. His greatest success came as a tag team competitor, as he and Crazy Luke Graham defeated the team of Dick the Bruiser and The Shiek in 1971 to become the first WWWF World Tag Team Champions. Tyler also challenged Bruno Sammartino for the WWWF Championship in 1966. In 1980 he fought Angelo Mosca Sr. for the Canadian Heavyweight title in Toronto.

While working as a heel manager for Gino Brito's Lutte Internationale, Tarzan Tyler died, along with fellow wrestler Pierre 'Mad Dog' Lefébvre and referee Adrien Desbois, in Laurentides Wildlife Reserve upon returning from a wrestling event in Chicoutimi, Québec on December 24, 1985, in a car crash.

He was a three-time heavyweight champion for Grand Prix Wrestling in Montréal in the 1970s.

Championships and accomplishments
American Wrestling Association
AWA Midwest Heavyweight Championship (2 times)

Big Time Wrestling
NWA World Tag Team Championship (1 time) – with The Alaskan

Central States Wrestling
NWA Central States Heavyweight Championship (1 time)

Championship Wrestling from Florida
NWA Brass Knuckles Championship (Florida version) (2 times)
NWA Florida Heavyweight Championship (1 time)
NWA Florida Television Championship (2 times, inaugural)
NWA Southern Heavyweight Championship (Florida version) (2 times)
NWA Southern Tag Team Championship (Florida version) (1 time) - with Louie Tillet
NWA World Tag Team Championship (Florida version) (2 times) - with Tim Tyler (1) and Freddie Blassie (1)

Japan Wrestling Association
NWA International Tag Team Championship (1 time) - with Bill Watts

Mid-South Sports
NWA Georgia Heavyweight Championship (1 time)
NWA World Tag Team Championship (Georgia version) (1 time) - with Lenny Montana
NWA International Tag Team Championship (Georgia version) (1 time) - with Lenny Montana

World Wide Wrestling Federation
WWWF International Tag Team Championship (1 time) - with Luke Graham
World Tag Team Championship (1 time, inaugural) - with Luke Graham

International Wrestling Association (1970s)
IWA North American Heavyweight Championship (1 time)

Stampede Wrestling
Stampede Wrestling International Tag Team Championship (1 time) - with Mighty Ursus

References

External links
 

1927 births
1985 deaths
Canadian male professional wrestlers
Stampede Wrestling alumni
20th-century professional wrestlers
NWF North American Heavyweight Champions
NWA Florida Heavyweight Champions
NWA Florida Television Champions
NWA Southern Heavyweight Champions (Florida version)
NWA Brass Knuckles Champions (Florida version)
Professional wrestlers from Montreal
NWA World Tag Team Champions (Florida version)
Stampede Wrestling International Tag Team Champions
NWA International Tag Team Champions
NWA Georgia Heavyweight Champions